Professor Helen Lochhead is an Australian architect, urbanist and Dean of the Faculty of Built Environment at UNSW Sydney. She is also the 2019 President of the Australian Institute of Architects.

Biography 
Helen Lochhead graduated from the University of Sydney with a Bachelor of Architecture and went on to complete a Master of Science (Architecture and Urban Design), from Columbia Graduate School of Architecture, Planning and Preservation. She is a registered architect, landscape architect and planner.

Lochhead is an architect and urban designer with over 20 years of senior management and project delivery experience in both private and public sectors in Australia and the United States. Her career has focused on the inception, planning, design and delivery of complex large-scale urban projects.

In 2013 Lochhead was awarded the prestigious Marion Mahony Griffin Prize by the NSW Chapter of the Australian Institute of Architects. The citation states that Lochhead 'has worked tirelessly to achieve design excellence in the public sector working on architectural, urban design and landscape design projects. Through her role on committees, design review panels and competition juries, and from within local council and state government agencies, she has worked determinedly, managing to extricate herself from procedural inertia and the daily difficulties of working in a bureaucracy to make design quality and sustainability important considerations in major capital works projects. Prior to accepting a secondment as the director of strategic developments at Sydney Harbour Foreshore Authority (SHFA), Helen championed the promotion of women architects within the GAO, and has played an important role in mentoring graduates. She has taught at three of Sydney's universities and was an adjunct professor at the University of Sydney, prior to her current appointment.

Lochhead had won numerous awards for her contributions to the profession, and was a 2013–14 Lincoln/Loeb Fellow at the Graduate School of Design at Harvard University and the Lincoln Institute of Land Policy. During her fellowship she studied design, policy, and governance strategies that can deliver more sustainable climate-resilient coastal cities.

Professional career 
Lochhead was Director of Helen Lochhead Urban Projects (1996–2006) where she prepared masterplans and Development Control Plans (DCPs) including Rozelle Hospital & Gladesville Hospital Master Plans, Rouse Hill Town Centre, Mascot Station Precinct, public domain projects, multi-unit housing projects.

From 2004 to 2007 she was Executive Director, Sustainability at Sydney Olympic Park Authority. Lochhead became Deputy Government Architect in the NSW Government Architect's Office in 2007.

In 2012–2013 Lochhead was Executive Director, Place Development, at the Sydney Harbour Foreshore Authority.

Lochhead was awarded 2014 Lincoln/Loeb Fellow at the Graduate School of Design at Harvard University and the Lincoln Institute of Land Policy and Bogliasco Fellow in 2015.

Lochhead is the Dean of the Faculty of Built Environment UNSW in Sydney.

Lochhead was a nationally-elected councillor of the Australian Institute of Architects since 2013 and in 2019 became the National President, taking over from Clare Cousins.

In 2019 Helen Lochhead was awarded the Australian Institute of Architects Paula Whitman Leadership in Gender Equity Prize. The prize is named for the distinguished Australian architect, Paula Whitman.

Personal life 
Lochhead has studied and worked in Australia and the United States.

Awards 
 2019: Paula Whitman Leadership in Gender Equity Prize, Australian Institute of Architects
 2019: 100 Women of Influence, The Australian Financial Review
 2015: Bogliasco Fellowship, The Bogliasco Foundation, Italy
 2015: AIA Presidents Prize for contribution to the design of the built environment of Sydney, design education and the profession
 2013 Loeb Fellowship, Harvard University Graduate School of Design 
 2013 Lincoln Fellowship, Lincoln Institute of Land Policy, Cambridge
 2013: AIA Marion Mahony Griffin Prize (for a distinctive body of work & contribution of a female architect to the profession)
 2011: AILA National Award for leadership in adaptation to climate change and promotion of sustainable Australian settlements (with OEH) 
 2010: AV Jennings Churchill Fellowship
 2009: National Association of Women Vision Award for leadership in the construction industry
 1996: Landcom Design competition winner 
 1995: Australian Postgraduate Award
 1993: RAIA Merit Award for Urban Design 
 1991: The Byera Hadley Travelling Scholarship, Board of Architects 
 1986: William Kinne Fellows Travelling Scholarship, Columbia University, New York
 1985: Fulbright Fellowship
 1985: University of Sydney Hezlet Bequest Travelling Scholarship
 1985: Stephenson Turner Scholarship & Medal
 1984: NSW Board of Architects Medallion
 1982: Marten Bequest Travelling Scholarship

References

Further reading 
 2013 Marion Mahony Griffin Prize, Australian Institute of Architects
 The Design Dividend, presentation by Helen Lochhead, Lincoln Institute of Land Policy

External Links:

 Singh, Skendha. “How to Be a Good Architect - Q & A with Prof. Lochhead,” 2017. https://www.braingainmag.com/how-to-be-a-good-architect-q-a-with-prof-lochhead.htm.
 Poulet, Peter. “News and Nuance.” Architecture Australia 96, no. 2 (April 3, 2007): 20–22.
 Sydney, UNSW. “Professor Helen Lochhead.” UNSW. Accessed October 27, 2021. https://research.unsw.edu.au/people/professor-helen-lochhead.

Living people
Australian women architects
Architects in government
20th-century Australian architects
21st-century Australian architects
Columbia Graduate School of Architecture, Planning and Preservation alumni
University of Sydney alumni
Year of birth missing (living people)
20th-century Australian women
21st-century Australian women